Fazlollah Dehkhoda (Persian: فضل الله دهخدا, born 18 March 1949) is a retired Iranian bantamweight weightlifter. He placed eighth at the 1976 Summer Olympics and ninth at the 1974 World Weightlifting Championships.

References

1949 births
Living people
Iranian male weightlifters
Olympic weightlifters of Iran
Weightlifters at the 1976 Summer Olympics
20th-century Iranian people